San Corbiniano is a 21st-century Titular church for a Cardinal-priest and a parish church (in full San Corbiniano all'Infernetto) in southern Rome's XXVIIth prefecture.

Church 
Its address is Via Ermanno Wolf Ferrari 201, Infernetto, Roma, Lazio 00124, near Via Erik Satie. The parish, in the Pope's own Diocese of Rome, was founded as Parish of S. Guglielmo al Laurentino on 1989.10.20 and renamed on 20 June 2008.

The parish church was dedicated to Saint Corbinian on 20 March 2011.

It enjoyed a papal visit from Pope Benedict XVI on 20 March 2011.

Cardinal title 
The titulus Sancti Corbiniani, for Cardinal-priests, was established on 20 November 2010.

Cardinal-protectors 
The following Cardinal-priests have been its cardinal-protector :

 Reinhard Marx (20 November 2010 – present)

Sources and external links
 GCatholic the cardinal title
 GCatholic the church
 Parochial website (in Italian)

Corbiniano
Corbiniano